The Sendeturm Jauerling (Jauerling Transmission Tower) is a tower for directional radio services, FM and TV broadcasting on the Jauerling mountain in Austria. Sendeturm Jauerling was built in 1958. It consists of a 35-metre-high free-standing steel framework tower, which carries a guyed steel tube mast on the top and has a total height of 141 metres.

External links

 http://www.wabweb.net/radio/frames/radioaf5.htm
 http://www.skyscraperpage.com/diagrams/?b46990

See also
List of towers

Radio in Austria
Towers in Austria